The Michelob Senior Classic was a golf tournament on the Champions Tour from 1981 to 1982. It was played in Tampa, Florida at the Carrollwood Village Country Club.

The purse for the 1982 tournament was US$125,000, with $20,000 going to the winner. The tournament was founded in 1981 as the Michelob-Egypt Temple Senior Classic.

Winners
Michelob Senior Classic
1982 Don January

Michelob-Egypt Temple Senior Classic
1981 Don January

Source:

References

Former PGA Tour Champions events
Golf in Florida
Sports competitions in Tampa, Florida
20th century in Tampa, Florida
1981 establishments in Florida
1982 disestablishments in Florida